This is a list of singles that have peaked in the Top 10 of the Billboard Hot 100 during 1971.

The Carpenters, Three Dog Night, Donny Osmond, Marvin Gaye, Aretha Franklin, and The Partridge Family each had three top-ten hits in 1971, tying them for the most top-ten hits during the year.

Top-ten singles

1970 peaks

1972 peaks

See also
 1971 in music
 List of Hot 100 number-one singles of 1971 (U.S.)
 Billboard Year-End Hot 100 singles of 1971

References

General sources

Joel Whitburn Presents the Billboard Hot 100 Charts: The Seventies
Additional information obtained can be verified within Billboard's online archive services and print editions of the magazine.

1971
United States Hot 100 Top 10